Au Wai Lun (born 14 August 1971, in Hong Kong) is a former Hong Kong professional football player. He is considered one of the best strikers in Hong Kong.

Playing career
Au made his debut in Hong Kong First Division League for Tin Tin on 20 December 1988, against Happy Valley. He was 17 years old at the time and the final result of the match 0–2.

Au was the leading goal scorer of the Hong Kong national football team, but retired from international football after an exhibition match with Manchester United on 23 July 2005.

On the pitch, Au was recognized easily by his hairstyle – he sports peroxide-blond streaks in his locks. He wore the number 7 jersey for South China and was the captain of the team.

He is also remembered by his famous "cross passing during 1-on-1" in the final of 2002 Carlsberg Cup against Honduras. In the match, he received a pass from his teammate, and got a goal opportunity. However, he passed the ball back and did not shoot. Further jokes on this were developed after this incident.

Being a veteran striker, Au is valued for his international experience and his strong aerial ability. The 6' tall striker remains one of the best headers in the League.

In the 2005–06 season, his good performance throughout the season could not prevent South China from finishing 7th in the league, with 2 points below the relegation line. He scored 8 league goals that season (4th among all players, 1st among Hong Kong players). Two years after retiring, he chose to return and play for Eastern, one of his former clubs.

Retirement
In the summer of 2007, after being offered a new contract with a salary cut by South China, he decided to retire. He claimed that the entire squad received new contracts with increments, but he was the only one with a salary cut. He thought the club was being unfair to him, who contributed for many years, even when the team performed so poor for several seasons.

Personal life
After his retirement announcement, he was approached by Star Publishing and with the help of a professional writer, published his biography titled, "Lun . Football Biography" (倫．球傳).

Career statistics
As of 19 May 2007

Honours

Club
Eastern
Hong Kong Third Division: 2010–11, 2011–12

Ernest Borel
Hong Kong FA Cup: 1991–92
Viceroy Cup: 1991–92

South China
Hong Kong First Division: 1996–97, 1999–2000, 2006–07
Hong Kong Senior Shield: 1995–96, 1996–97, 1998–99, 1999–2000, 2001–02, 2002–03, 2006–07
Hong Kong FA Cup: 1995–96, 1998–99, 2001–02, 2006–07
HKFA League Cup: 2001–02

Individual
Hong Kong Footballer of the Year: 1997, 2006

References

External links
 Au Wai Lun at HKFA

1971 births
Living people
Hong Kong footballers
Hong Kong international footballers
Association football forwards
Hong Kong First Division League players
South China AA players
Sea Bee players
Eastern Sports Club footballers
Hong Kong Rangers FC players
Hong Kong League XI representative players
Footballers at the 1994 Asian Games
Footballers at the 1998 Asian Games
Asian Games competitors for Hong Kong